Atalantia monophylla is a species of plants in the family Rutaceae. They are woody climbers naturally found in tropical regions.
 
Several species in the genus Atalantia monophylla have been used in traditional medicine, such as the Ayurvedic system from India.

References

Aurantioideae